Lisa Martinek (11 February 1972 – 28 June 2019) was a German actress. She appeared in about 80 film and television productions since 1993, mostly in German television. On 28 June 2019, she died in a swimming accident in Italy.

Filmography
  (2000, TV film), as Maria Matuschek
  (2004, TV film), as Sophie Rheinsberg
  (2007, TV film), as Juliane Thomas
  (2014, TV film), as Kerstin Faber

References

External links
Official website

German film actresses
Actresses from Stuttgart
1972 births
2019 deaths
20th-century German actresses
21st-century German actresses